New Jersey's 4th congressional district is a congressional district that stretches along the New Jersey Shore. It has been represented by Republican Chris Smith since 1981, the second-longest currently serving member of the US House of Representatives and the longest serving member of Congress from New Jersey in history.  

Although the 4th district had a presence in Mercer County for decades, it lost its two towns in the county (Hamilton and Robbinsville) following the redistricting process in late 2021, which was based on the 2020 census. The district is currently contained to Monmouth County and Ocean County.

Counties and municipalities in the district
 
For the 118th and successive Congresses (based on redistricting following the 2020 Census), the district contains all or portions of two counties and 40 municipalities.

Municipalities in the district are:

Monmouth County (19)
Avon-By-The-Sea Borough, Belmar Borough, Brielle Borough, Colts Neck Township, Eatontown Borough, Farmingdale Borough, Freehold Township (part; also 3rd), Howell Township, Lake Como Borough, Manasquan Borough, Middletown Township (part; also 6th), Ocean Township, Sea Girt Borough, Shrewsbury Borough, Shrewsbury Township, Spring Lake Borough, Spring Lake Heights Borough, Tinton Falls Borough, and Wall Township

Ocean County (21)
Beachwood, Berkeley Township (part; also 2nd), Bay Head Borough, Brick, Island Heights, Jackson Township, Lacey (part; also 2nd), Lakehurst Borough, Lakewood Township, Lavallette, Manchester Township, Mantoloking, Ocean Gate, Pine Beach, Point Pleasant Beach, Point Pleasant Borough (part; also 2nd), Plumsted Township, Seaside Heights, Seaside Park, South Toms River, Toms River,

Election results in statewide races

List of members representing the district

Recent election results

2012

2014

2016

2018

2020

2022

References

 Congressional Biographical Directory of the United States 1774–present

04
Mercer County, New Jersey
Monmouth County, New Jersey
Ocean County, New Jersey
Constituencies established in 1799
1799 establishments in New Jersey
Constituencies disestablished in 1801
1801 disestablishments in New Jersey
Constituencies established in 1843
1843 establishments in New Jersey